Sacred Heart University Community Theatre (2020–present) is a University-run Community Theatre in Fairfield, Connecticut. It was formerly known as the Community Film Institute (2009–2011) and also as Fairfield Community Theatre Foundation (2001–2009). In 2019, Kleban Properties bought the long-vacant theater and leased the space to Sacred Heart University, which  turned it into an independent, nonprofit venue for cinema, performance and education . The Theatre officially re-opened December 23, 2020. In addition to the restored marquee, upgrades to the property have included a larger stage, a balcony with a skybox, a renovated front office and new digital technology, according to theatre Director Bill Harris .

The theater is located on Fairfield's main street, 1424 Post Road.

Volunteers and finances
Under previous ownership and management, the staff was mostly under the age of eighteen, and the theater was a popular place for teens to earn community service hours in order to apply for college.

According to the theater's Web site, it cost more than $20,000 a year to maintain the building, including more than $7,500 a year in maintenance costs for the 75-year-old marquee sign and $10,000-plus for the  DVD projection system's 35mm film projection equipment (replacement cost for one film projector would be $75,000). 
The projection system "had enhanced the theater's capabilities" by "increasing the opportunities for special programs and events at the theater."

Programs
The foundation ran a number of programs using the theater under previous ownership and management:
The Casablanca Club program provided free showings of classic films during the afternoon to seniors and their guests.
The Cinemoms program provided free movies to mothers and their babies (under 2 years old). The sound is turned down a bit and the lights are left on. Changing stations are available.
The theater's Film Movement Series showed two film series each year of quality independent films that have had very limited or no distribution.
Cinefest Fairfield was an annual film festival featuring short films of Fairfield University students, alumni and faculty which showcases the Department of Visual and Performing Arts' innovative New Media: Film, Television and Radio Program.
The Community Theatre Foundation Film School provided young people with an education in filmmaking in partnership with the Fairfield University Media Center.
The Student Film Festival annually presented films made by high school students, with awards to the best works in various categories.

History
The theater first began operation in 1920 as a local moviehouse. It added a second screen room in 1979. There are many stories regarding the theater's changing construction. For instance, behind one of the balconies, there used to be an office. It was accompanied with a lounge, but in 1950, the owner decided to make the office bigger, compromising the lounge. A lift would raise an organ out of the basement and onto the stage. The theater was also home to stage performances in the past but was converted into a movie theater in the 1970s.

Starting in the late 1990s, the Loew's chain attempted to run it as an art house, but failed and closed it in spring 2001.

Leo Redgate, a real estate investor in town who remembered seeing "Jaws" at the moviehouse as a kid, decided it would be good for the community to revive the place. He created the theater foundation, invested his own money to fix up the building, and rounded up volunteers, including high school students. By the end of 2001, the theater was open again.

But  the foundation faced another challenge. Repairs were desperately needed to the property, which Redgate wanted to buy from the Pollack family. He had made a couple of multimillion-dollar offers, but Norman Pollack told the Fairfield Citizen-News that the seven members of the family who make up the limited liability company are not inclined to sell at this time. Redgate was not asking for anything unreasonable in wanting to buy the property. The lease even stated that he would've matched any offer the Pollacks received - whether then or ten years from then - for as long as he still rents the place.

Among the goals of the foundation were to restore and operate the theater and provide affordable entertainment, unite young people in the spirit of volunteerism, and act as a catalyst for community involvement, inspiration, and support. However, Redgate failed to deliver on his promises when the foundation faced financial struggles owing more than eighty thousand dollars on the lease and over fifteen thousand to film distributors and services provided to the foundation.

The Fairfield Citizen reported that Redgate's decision in stepping away from the foundation had nothing to do with the financial struggles it was facing and two lawsuits that were filed by Buena Vista Pictures and Sony Pictures . Redgate left a lot in question when he claimed that "there is no issue with the non-profit status" when in fact the Internal Revenue Service revoked the non-profit status in 2010. The theatre's final public showing was held on September 8, 2011. 

The Fairfield Citizen reported that new leasing efforts were underway to find someone who would be willing to take over the Fairfield landmark. 

The Community Theatre was bought by Sacred Heart University in the efforts to save the theatre and restore the town Landmark. Along with upgrades to the marquee, the  interior and technology have been updated too.

Partners
Newman's Own and its founder, Paul Newman
Westport Country Playhouse
Film Movement
Fairfield University Media Center

References

External links
Cinema Tour Photo Profile
Fairfield Community Theater Foundation Website
New York Times article on the theater, July 23, 2006
Fairfield Citizen-News Staff, "Don't Let The Lights Dim On Community Theatre" Fairfield Citizen-News, April 30, 2008, accessed July 9th, 2008

Buildings and structures in Fairfield, Connecticut
Tourist attractions in Fairfield County, Connecticut
Cinemas and movie theaters in Connecticut
2001 establishments in Connecticut